Elections to Coventry City Council were held in June 2004.  Due to boundary changes, the entire council was up for election. The council remained with no overall control, but the Conservatives became the largest party.

After the election, the composition of the council was
Conservative 27
Labour 22
Liberal Democrat 3
Socialist Alternative 2

Election result

Ward results

Note that seat gains and losses are compared with the previous seat of the same name. All eighteen seats had redrawn boundaries.

References

2004
2004 English local elections
2000s in Coventry